Terence John Dunleavy  (23 November 1928 – 14 March 2022) was a New Zealand wine industry leader, politician and columnist. In the 1990 New Year Honours, he was appointed a Member of the Order of the British Empire, for services to the wine industry and the community.

References

1928 births
2022 deaths
People from Te Awamutu
People educated at Sacred Heart College, Auckland
New Zealand businesspeople
New Zealand National Party politicians
New Zealand Members of the Order of the British Empire
New Zealand justices of the peace
New Zealand columnists